Marvin Leonardo Piñón Polanco (born 12 June 1991) is a Mexican professional footballer who plays as a midfielder.

Club career
Piñón was one of the young promises of Monterrey but only played a few minutes with the senior team. He made his senior team debut on January 8, 2011, as a starter in a match against San Luis in a 2 - 0 loss of Monterrey

Honours
Mexico U20
CONCACAF U-20 Championship: 2011
FIFA U-20 World Cup 3rd Place: 2011

References

External links
 Team profile
 Player profile

1991 births
Living people
Mexico under-20 international footballers
Footballers from Tamaulipas
C.F. Monterrey players
Correcaminos UAT footballers
Querétaro F.C. footballers
Lobos BUAP footballers
Liga MX players
Association football midfielders
Mexican footballers